Daniel Tarric Doram (born 13 October 1997) is a Sint Maarten cricketer who has played internationally for the Dutch national side. He plays for the Leeward Islands cricket team in West Indian domestic cricket.

Netherlands
Doram made his first-class debut for the Netherlands in July 2013, aged only 15. Playing against Ireland in an Intercontinental Cup fixture, he took 5/82 in the first innings, becoming one of the youngest players to take a first-class five-wicket haul (and also the first Sint Maartener). A few months later, Doram also made his List A debut, playing against Northamptonshire in the 2013 Yorkshire Bank 40 (an English competition). After that, he was not recalled to the Dutch team until June 2015, when he featured in an Intercontinental Cup fixture against Papua New Guinea.

England
Doram attended school in England, at Hurstpierpoint College, West Sussex, having earlier attended St. Maarten Academy. He was inducted into the Sussex County Cricket Club's academy in 2015, and has played for Sussex in the Second XI Championship. In 2018 he became the overseas professional at Crook Town CC in the Durham Cricket League helping them to win promotion to the North East Premier League. He returned to the club for their inaugural NEPL season in 2019 and during the season was selected for the NEPL Representative XI which played MCC. In his two seasons with Crook he scored 1741 runs at an average of 40.49 with 2 centuries and took 102 wickets at an average of 26.94 with 3 times claiming 5 wickets in an innings. Prior to Covid19 he had agreed to play for Torquay CC, one of the most successful clubs in the Devon Cricket League, for the 2020 season.

West Indies
Doram made his senior debut for Leeward Islands in December 2018 against Barbados in the 2018–19 Regional Four Day Competition. After a gap of three years, he returned to first-class cricket in February 2022 in the 2021–22 West Indies Championship, taking 3/16 against Guyana.

References

External links
Player profile and statistics at Cricket Archive
Player profile and statistics at ESPNcricinfo

1997 births
Living people
People educated at Hurstpierpoint College
Dutch cricketers
Sint Maarten cricketers